Moran of the Marines is a lost 1928 American comedy silent film directed by Frank R. Strayer and written by Ray Harris, Agnes Brand Leahy, George Marion Jr., Sam Mintz and Linton Wells. The film stars Richard Dix, Ruth Elder, Roscoe Karns, Brooks Benedict, E. H. Calvert and Duke Martin. The film was released on October 13, 1928, by Paramount Pictures.

Cast 
Richard Dix as Michael Moran
Ruth Elder as Vivian Marshall
Roscoe Karns as Swatty
Brooks Benedict as Basil Worth
E. H. Calvert as Gen. Marshall
Duke Martin as The Sergeant
Tetsu Komai as Sun Yat

References

External links 

 
 

1928 films
1920s English-language films
Silent American comedy films
1928 comedy films
Paramount Pictures films
Films directed by Frank R. Strayer
American black-and-white films
Films about the United States Marine Corps
Lost American films
American silent feature films
1928 lost films
Lost comedy films
1920s American films